Robert Melville Lee (born August 7, 1946) is a former professional American football quarterback and punter. He played college football for Arizona State University and the University of the Pacific. He was selected 441st overall in the 1968 NFL/AFL draft by the Minnesota Vikings. He was nicknamed "General" Bob Lee during his brief period of success with the Atlanta Falcons. After his stint with the Falcons he rejoined the Vikings before ending his fourteen year career with the Los Angeles Rams.

Early life
Lee was born in Columbus, Ohio. He would attend Lowell High School in San Francisco, California.

College career
Lee originally played college football for the Arizona State Sun Devils in 1963 and 1964, lettering in 1964. He then attended the City College of San Francisco for the 1965 before finishing his career with the Pacific Tigers, lettering in both 1966 and 1967.

Professional career

Minnesota Vikings (first stint)
Lee was drafted in the seventeenth round of the 1968 NFL/AFL draft by the Minnesota Vikings of the National Football League (NFL). As a member of the Vikings, he saw action as a punter in Super Bowl IV.

Atlanta Falcons
On May 14, 1973, the Atlanta Falcons dealt quarterback Bob Berry and a first round draft pick for Lee and linebacker Lonnie Warwick. During his stint with the Falcons, he led Atlanta to a 20–14 victory over the 9–0 Minnesota Vikings on Monday Night Football on November 19, 1973. 1973 was Lee's most successful season in the NFL. He replaced Dick Shiner as the Falcons quarterback in Week 5 and led the Falcons to seven consecutive wins, including the win over the Vikings, on their way to a 9–5 record, the Falcons' best season in their history at that point.  Lee started ten games and passed for 1,786 yards with ten touchdowns and eight interceptions.

Minnesota Vikings (second stint)
In 1976, Lee threw a touchdown pass in Super Bowl XI. With starting quarterback Fran Tarkenton's late season injury in the 1977 season, Lee started and led the Vikings to a 14–7 win over the Los Angeles Rams in the Divisional Round of the Playoffs.  The game was infamous due to the muddy conditions. Lee started the NFC Championship the next week as well against the Dallas Cowboys, but the Vikings lost 23–6.

Los Angeles Rams
He was also a backup in Super Bowl XIV as a member of the Los Angeles Rams.

He is one of twelve quarterbacks to post both a perfect quarterback rating and a zero passer rating over the course of their careers, and is the first to have done so in the same season.

NFL career statistics

Regular season

Postseason

Personal life
His son, Zac Lee, played football for the University of Nebraska and was the team's starting quarterback for most of the 2009 season, he briefly signed with the Seattle Seahawks and he played for the Las Vegas Locomotives of the United Football League (UFL). His daughter, Jenna Lee, worked in various roles for the Fox Business Network starting in 2007, prior to becoming an anchor on the Fox News Channel in 2010.

References

1946 births
Living people
American football quarterbacks
Pacific Tigers football players
Players of American football from Columbus, Ohio
Minnesota Vikings players
Atlanta Falcons players
Los Angeles Rams players
United States Football League announcers